Nonso Diobi (born July 17, 1976) is a multiple award winning Nigerian actor and film director. While studying Theatre Art at the University of Nigeria, He made his debut on-screen appearance in a 2001 film titled Border Line followed by an outstanding performance in the movie titled "Hatred". He went on to give a sterling performance in the movie 'Across the bridge' which gave him breakthrough after which he became a house hold name across Africa. Diobi is a native of Nawfia, a small town in Anambra State, Nigeria. He is the founder and chairman of Golden tape media, a leading film/tv production company in Africa. Nonso Diobi is a UN peace ambassador as well as teachers without Borders ambassador. He has starred in over 76 films.

Filmography

Awards and nominations

References

External links

1976 births
Living people
21st-century Nigerian male actors
Igbo male actors
Nigerian film directors
University of Nigeria alumni
Nigerian male television actors
Nigerian male film actors
Actors from Anambra State